DUT-5 (DUT ⇒ Dresden University of Technology) is a material in the class of metal-organic frameworks (MOFs). Metal-organic frameworks are crystalline materials, in which metals are linked by ligands (linker molecules) to form repeating three-dimensional structures known as coordination entities. The DUT-5 framework is an expanded version of the MIL-53 structure and consists of Al3+ metal centers and biphenyl-4,4'-dicarboxylate (BPDC) linker molecules. It consists of inorganic [M-OH] chains, which are connected by the biphenyl-4,4'-dicarboxylate linkers to four neighboring inorganic chains. The resulting structure contains diamond-shaped micropores extending in one dimension.

Structural analogs 
The DUT-5 structure was initially synthesized with Al3+ as metal center, but other isostructural materials, whose structures are comparable to DUT-5, have also been prepared with metals having oxidation states of +II or +IV . 

Due to the tool-box like design of metal-organic framework materials, other organic molecules, which are structurally similar to biphenyl-4,4'-dicarboxylate, have also been used as linker molecules for the synthesis of functionalized DUT-5 materials, which contain uncoordinated functional groups in their framework structure. For the functionalized DUT-5 materials, the additional functional groups at the functional biphenyl-4,4'dicarboxylate linkers in the DUT-5 framework have been used for post-synthetic modification reactions to further modify the framework structure after the initial synthesis or to alter the adsorption properties.

References 

Metal-organic frameworks